Eddie Thompson (27 February 1907 – 18 March 1982) was an English cricketer. He played for Essex between 1926 and 1929.

References

External links

1907 births
1982 deaths
English cricketers
Essex cricketers
People from Leyton